This is a list of the shadow cabinets of the United Kingdom, including the unofficial the frontbench team of spokespersons of other parties from 1964 to the present date.

Shadow Cabinets

1964–present

See also

List of British governments
Official Opposition of the United Kingdom

Official Opposition (United Kingdom)
British shadow cabinets
Shadow cabinets